Communication Monographs is a quarterly peer-reviewed academic journal covering research on human communication. The journal is published by Taylor & Francis on behalf of the National Communication Association. Communication Monographs publishes original scholarship that contributes to the understanding of human communication.

Articles in Communication Monographs should endeavor to ask questions about the diverse and complex issues that interest communication scholars.

The journal especially welcomes questions that bridge boundaries traditionally separating scholars within the communication discipline and that address issues of clear theoretical, conceptual, methodological, and/or social importance.

Diverse approaches to addressing and answering these questions, including theoretical argument, quantitative and qualitative empirical research, and rhetorical and textual analysis, as well as acknowledgement of the often tentative and partial nature of any answers, are welcomed. Approaches to answering questions should be clearly relevant to the questions asked, rigorous in terms of both argument and method, cognizant of alternative interpretations, and contextualized within the wider body of communication scholarship.

Abstracting and indexing 
The journal is abstracted and indexed in

External links 
 

Routledge academic journals
English-language journals
Publications established in 1934
Quarterly journals
Communication journals
Academic journals associated with learned and professional societies